Colin Thwaites (born 23 January 1955) is an Australian former cricketer. He played six first-class cricket matches for Victoria between 1976 and 1977.

See also
 List of Victoria first-class cricketers

References

External links
 

1955 births
Living people
Australian cricketers
Victoria cricketers
Cricketers from Melbourne